Hannah Mary Rothschild  (born 22 May 1962) is a British author, businesswoman, philanthropist and documentary filmmaker.  In addition to screenplays and journalism, she has published a biography and two novels. She serves on charitable and financial boards. In August 2015, she became the first female to chair the Board of Trustees of the National Gallery in London.

Early life
Hannah Mary Rothschild was born on 22 May 1962. She is the eldest child of Jacob Rothschild, 4th Baron Rothschild, and his wife Serena Dunn Rothschild. Through her father she is a member of the Rothschild banking family. She was educated at St Paul's Girls' School and later Marlborough College, and she read Modern History at St Hilda's College, Oxford.

Career
Rothschild's career started as a researcher in the BBC's Music and Arts department in the mid-1980s and quickly graduated to directing films for Saturday Review, Arena and Omnibus and initiating and making programmes for the series The Great Picture Chase and Relative Values. Later she set up an independent film company with Jake Auerbach (Rothschild Auerbach Ltd.) making documentaries for the BBC and others including profiles of Frank Auerbach, Walter Sickert, R. B. Kitaj. In 1997, Rothschild joined London Films Ltd as Head of Drama and set up the television series The Scarlet Pimpernel starring Richard E. Grant. She returned to filmmaking and directed three films for the BBC's Storyville series and HBO. In 2008, following a radio programme on the same subject, Rothschild produced and directed The Jazz Baroness (2008), about her great-aunt Pannonica de Koenigswarter's exploits in and support of New York's jazz world. This was followed by Hi Society (2009), a fly-on-the-wall documentary about Nicky Haslam, the interior designer, author and society darling. Mandelson: The Real PM? (2010) followed the UK's former Business Secretary Peter Mandelson in the run-up to the 2010 general election.

Inspired by the Storyville programme, Rothchild wrote a biography of her great aunt, The Baroness: The Search for Nica the Rebellious Rothschild, which was published by Virago in 2012. It was described as "Riveting, touching and insightful" by The Daily Telegraph. A few years earlier, a radio documentary profile of Nica, The Jazz Baroness, was broadcast by BBC Radio 4 on 12 February 2008. Her documentaries and shorts have aired on the BBC, HBO, PBS and others and been screened and won awards at Telluride, Tribecca, London, Sheffield film festivals. She has written screenplays for Working Title and Ridley Scott. She also wrote a history of Channel 4's films and filmmakers; contributed to anthologies including Corfu, the Garden Isle ; and Virago at 40.

Rothchild's first novel The Improbability of Love was published in May 2015. The story follows a female protagonist who comes across a lost Watteau and becomes embroiled in the dealings of the art world's elite. The Guardian said "her depiction of the rarefied art world is gripping". The book was shortlisted for the Baileys Prize and was joint winner of the Bollinger Everyman Wodehouse Prize. It has been translated into more than twenty languages and was chosen as one of Waterstones "Books of the Year".

Her third book, a novel The House of Trelawney, was published in February 2020 by Bloomsbury and Knopf. It follows the lives and fortunes of three generations of a dysfunctional Cornish aristocratic family through the crash of 2008. Described by Amanda Craig in The Guardian as "Irresistible fun" and by Lynn Barber in The Daily Telegraph as a "gripping family saga". "Her style has been compared to comic writers such as Waugh and Mitford, which are apt in terms of both style and milieu, but comparisons can also be made to Austen and Dickens, as she shares their ability to create comic characters and to then put those characters in situations that allows the author to make satirical/social commentary." The book has been nominated for Bollinger Everyman Wodehouse Prize for 2020.

Her fourth book, a novel titled High Time, will be published in June 2023 by Bloomsbury and Knopf.

Rothschild has lectured on art and literature at the Getty Institute, Courtauld, the Royal Academy, the Hay Festival and written for many publications, including The Times, The New York Times, The Observer, The Guardian, Daily Telegraph, Vanity Fair, Vogue, The Spectator and Harper's Bazaar, Financial Times, Elle,  Washington Post and others.

She is a Non-Executive Director of RIT Capital Partners and Windmill Hill Asset Management.

Philanthropy
She became a trustee of London's National Gallery in 2009 after applying to an advert in The Guardian. In 2013, she became the liaison trustee for the Tate Gallery. In August 2015, she became the first woman to chair the National Gallery's board. In 2017, her term was extended by four years; however she later resigned from the position in June 2019 citing a wish to devote more time to writing and to her family's wide-ranging activities and philanthropic concerns.  She will remain Chair of the American Friends of the National Gallery, a post she's held since August 2015.

She took over from her father Jacob as chair of Yad Hanadiv in July 2018. Yad Hanadiv is a charity Yad Hanadiv is dedicated to creating resources for advancing Israel as a healthy, vibrant, democratic society and equal opportunity for the benefit of all its inhabitants. It built the Knesset, the Supreme Court and in 2022 will complete the New National Library of Israel.

She is a trustee of The Rothschild Foundation, a registered charity, whose activities include preserving Waddesdon Manor in Buckinghamshire on behalf of its owner, the National Trust.

Rothschild was formerly a trustee of the Whitechapel Gallery and the ICA. She was the co-founder of the charity Artists on Film.

Rothschild originated the Illuminated River project to light Central London's bridges transforming the Thames at night "from a snake of darkness into a ribbon of light." An international jury, chaired by Rothschild chose American artist Leo Villareal and in July 2019 the first five of fifteen bridges were lit.

Personal life
In 1994, she married American filmmaker William Lord Brookfield and had three daughters, but they later divorced.

Title, styles and honours
22 May 1962 – 20 March 1990: Miss Hannah Mary Rothschild
20 March 1990 – 9 June 2018: The Honourable Hannah Mary Rothschild
9 June 2018 – present: The Honourable Hannah Mary Rothschild CBE

In the 2018 Queen's Birthday Honours, she was appointed Commander of the Order of the British Empire (CBE) for services to the arts and to charity.
 
In 2021, Rothschild was elected to the American Academy of Arts and Sciences.

References

External links

Biography at Rothschild Archive

1962 births
Living people
Film people from London
People educated at St Paul's Girls' School
People educated at Marlborough College
Alumni of St Hilda's College, Oxford
Place of birth missing (living people)
English people of Scottish descent
English people of Canadian descent
English people of German descent
English people of German-Jewish descent
English Jews
British Ashkenazi Jews
British documentary filmmakers
21st-century British novelists
21st-century British women writers
People associated with the National Gallery, London
Philanthropists from London
Women philanthropists
Commanders of the Order of the British Empire
Daughters of barons
Hannah Rothschild
Women documentary filmmakers